Ogu–Bolo (also spelled Ogu/Bolo) is a local government area (LGA) in Rivers State, Nigeria with headquarters in the town of Ogu. It is located on the Eastern Niger Delta.

Most people living in the region are of Ogu–Bolo heritage.

Postal codes for the area begin with 500.

Geography
 
Ogu/Bolo is neighboured by Eleme LGA in the west, Tai LGA in the north, Bonny LGA, Wakama Ama and Bolo communities in the south, and Okrika LGA in the southwest. 

Ogu/Bolo LGA consists of the districts of Bolo, Ele, Ogu, and Wakama, along with many other communities such as Adiai-Obiofu, Agwe, Amuajie, Ase-Imonita, Ase-Azaga, Isara, and others. Nearby cities and villages include Tai, Gokana, and Okrika. Neighbouring communities in other LGAs include: Sime, Barale, Barayira, Norkpo, and Nonwa in Tai LGA; Eteo and Onne in Eleme LGA; and Mgbemgbe Boko in Okrika LGA.

The region can be accessed by sea or land. It has well over 50 satellite villages and fishing settlements which can be reached from the sea by Ogu Creek and the Bonny River. These include:

 Abereniboye Kiri
 Ada Ama I
 Ada Ama II
 Adokiye kiri
 Adolphus Nemieboka Kiri
 Adufe Ama
 Afaka Ama
 Agakien Ama
 Agakien Kiri
 Amabara Ama
 Anigoboka Ama
 Apanatibo Kiri
 Atubonacheofoin-a Ama
 Brown Ama
 Bumo Kiri
 Chuku Ama
 Chuku Ama II
 Daso Ama
 Febie Ama
 Fombo Ama
 Fulobele Kiri
 Gream Kiri
 Ibiebele Kiri
 Ibiorika Kiri
 Ichi Kiri
 Igafe Ama
 Igbikiyemieari Ama
 Ikikafipiri Ama
 Ikpokiri I
 Ikpokiri II
 Ikpokiri III (wharf)
 Ilanga/Yikabo Ama
 IpiangbafibumoKiri
 Iwomabie Ama
 Kulo Kiri
 Mbi Kiri
 Mgbemgbeboko (Fubara Kiri)
 Nemieboka Ama
 New Ogu (Kporo Ama)
 Niniapukiri
 Nyanabo Ama
 Odo Kiri
 Ogobo Ama
 Ogonotoru Ama
 Ogugu-Chuku Ama
 Ogweinbie Ama
 Olobulo Ama
 Olomusoko Ama
 Omodarani Ama
 Orabere Kiri
 Orubie Ama
 Otobipi Kiri
 Owuapuigbiki Kiri
 Owugono
 Owukiri Ama
 Owupele Ama
 Piri Ama
 Sani Kiri
 Semenibipi/Iyo Kiri
 Siere Ama
 Tamuno Ama (Ofunguru Ama)
 Tende Ama
 Tendefe Ama
 Tombikuku
 Tububie Ama
 Yikabo Kiri
 Yude Ama

Culture

The Ogu/Bolo people have a distinctive and diverse culture, showcased in their festivals, cultural attire, and food. Important traditions in the culture of Ogu/Bolo people are the Iria puberty and marriage ceremonies, wrestling, traditional plays, burial rites, installation of chiefs, traditional rulers' ceremonies, and rites connected with day-to-day life.

Masquerades play a particularly important culture role. Some are colourful with make-ups or paraphernalia, and are a common sight throughout communities, especially during festive occasions. These performances are either religious, historical, or the personifications of legends, and are accompanied by song, music, and dance. Musical instruments used include pots and drums, wooden gongs, horns, and xylophones. All these are made locally by experts with an ancient tradition behind their craftsmanship.

Carving of masks and ceremonial canoes is a revered art, having matured in style and quality over generations. Gradually, the purely functional forms of these carvings were given new dimension and refinement which reflected a sense of aesthetic values.

The dances, plays, and masquerades depict the religious, social, and working life of the people. In turn, the life of the people has been greatly influenced by their culture. Thus, a spiritually ennobling circle has been set up. The Ogu man's (Okrika-Ijaw) confidence, his love of truth, fair-play, and wholesome dealings can all be traced to the influence of his unique cultural heritage.

Trade and commerce

Fishing and peasant farming are the main economic activities of Ogu/Bolo communities. Trading is principally done within the contiguous communities of Tai, Eleme, Bonny, and Andoni. The introduction of "legitimate" trade by Europeans in the mid-20th century increased the volume of commercial activities in Ogu.

Religious activities

Christianity and Western education were introduced by missionaries. The magnificent St. Martins’ Anglican Church in Ogu was completed in 1966. Even today, the church stands, not only as a marvelous architectural edifice, but also as a monumental and durable evidence of a peoples’ ancient devotion to progressive thought and action.

In 1973, the first post-primary school in Ogu/Bolo LGA was established: Government Secondary School, Ogu. For many years, this college remained distinguished from others by its priority. By the mid-1970's, Ogu had a modern hospital, good drinking water, and tarred roads.

References

Sources 
 
 

Local Government Areas in Rivers State
1998 establishments in Nigeria
1990s establishments in Rivers State